Ayanathur is a village in the Ariyalur taluk of Ariyalur district, Tamil Nadu, India.

Demographics 

 census, Ayanathur had a total population of 1462 with 728 males and 734 females.

References 

Villages in Ariyalur district